Laura Ann Osnes (born November 19, 1985) is an American actress and singer known for her work on the Broadway stage. She has played starring roles in Grease as Sandy, South Pacific as Nellie Forbush, Anything Goes as Hope Harcourt, and Bonnie and Clyde as Bonnie Parker, for which she received a Tony Award nomination for Best Actress in a Musical. She also starred in the title role of Rodgers & Hammerstein's Cinderella on Broadway, for which she received a Drama Desk Award and her second Tony Award nomination for Best Actress in a Musical.

Early life
Osnes was born in Burnsville, Minnesota, raised in nearby Eagan, a suburb of Saint Paul, and is a professed Christian. Her first acting performance was in the second grade, where she played a munchkin in The Wizard of Oz. She attended Eagan High School. Osnes attended the University of Wisconsin–Stevens Point for one year as a Musical Theatre major, before dropping out to pursue a professional career.

In 2005–2006 she returned to Minneapolis to be a performing apprentice at the Children's Theatre Company, performing in Working, Aladdin Jr., Prom, and Pippi Longstocking. She also played the lead of Sandy in Grease at the nation's largest dinner theatre, the Chanhassen Dinner Theatres, but her run was cut short when she was chosen to compete in the nationally televised Broadway talent competition Grease: You're the One that I Want!.

Long-time boyfriend Nathan Johnson proposed to Osnes on December 23, 2006. They were married on May 11, 2007. They live in Manhattan with their dog, Lyla.

In 2015, Osnes was a judge and mentor for the Songbook Academy, a summer intensive for high school students operated by the Great American Songbook Foundation and founded by Michael Feinstein.

Career

Grease: You're the One that I Want!

Laura Osnes was nicknamed "Small Town Sandy" in the show. She was a favorite to win during the entire course of the show, never showing up in the "sing-off" bottom two during the show's run. She was named the winner on March 25, 2007, which meant she would perform the lead character of Sandy opposite Max Crumm, who won the role of "Danny".

Osnes and Crumm played their final performances as Sandy and Danny on July 20, 2008, and they were succeeded by Ashley Spencer and Derek Keeling, two of the runners-up of Grease: You're the One that I Want!.

Post-Grease
Osnes starred in the Kennedy Center for the Performing Arts' Broadway: Three Generations, a three-act evening featuring condensed versions of Girl Crazy, Bye Bye Birdie, and Side Show. The show was presented at the Kennedy Center's Eisenhower Theater October 2–5, 2008. She then played Elizabeth (Lizzy) Bennet for the concert version of the new Broadway-aimed musical Pride & Prejudice that was presented October 21, 2008 at the Eastman Theatre in Rochester, New York. In early December Osnes returned home to Minneapolis and performed in a local Christmas pageant. On January 11, 2009, she took part in the Rock Tenor Showcase, a showcase of a new concert experience that melds classical and Broadway music with rock-n-roll songs, at the Florence Gould Hall in Manhattan, and then sang at Dreamlight Theatre Company's "Bright Lights" concert series on the evening of January 26 entitled A Night with The Ladies.

Stage career
In March 2009, Osnes took over the role of Ensign Nellie Forbush in the Lincoln Center Theater Broadway revival of South Pacific. She stayed with the show through October 4, 2009, when the production's original star, Kelli O'Hara, returned from maternity leave. She then starred as Bonnie Parker in the world premiere of Bonnie & Clyde at the La Jolla Playhouse from November 10 to December 20, 2009. Osnes returned to the role of Nellie in South Pacific on Broadway on January 5, 2010. She played her final performance on August 8, 2010. She reprised the role of Bonnie in Bonnie & Clyde at the Asolo Repertory Theatre, Sarasota, Florida in November and December 2010.

Osnes then played Hope Harcourt in the Broadway revival of Anything Goes, which began previews on March 10, 2011, and officially opened on April 7, 2011, starring Sutton Foster and Joel Grey. For this role Osnes received nominations for the Outer Critics Circle Award for Outstanding Featured Actress in a Musical as well as the Drama Desk Award for Outstanding Featured Actress in a Musical. She was also nominated for an Astaire Award for excellence in dance. Osnes departed the production on September 11, 2011.

Beginning previews on November 4, 2011 with a December 1 opening night, Osnes once again played Bonnie, this time in the Broadway debut of Bonnie and Clyde at the Gerald Schoenfeld Theatre. She was joined by her Asolo Rep castmate Jeremy Jordan as Clyde. The show received negative reviews, had lackluster ticket sales and closed on December 30, 2011.  However, despite the critics' distaste for the production, Osnes received rave reviews for her performance as well as her first Tony Award nomination for Best Leading Actress in a Musical.

Osnes next performed at the 2011 Kennedy Center Honors in a tribute to Barbara Cook alongside Sutton Foster, Rebecca Luker, Kelli O'Hara, Patti LuPone, Glenn Close and Audra McDonald.

In January 2012, she played the title character in a reading of a reworked adaptation of the Rodgers and Hammerstein musical, Cinderella. She then led the Encores! stage concert production of  Rodgers and Hammerstein's Pipe Dream, based on John Steinbeck's novel Sweet Thursday. Under the direction of Marc Bruni, the production ran from March 28 to April 1, 2012. On April 24, 2012, Osnes headlined a concert performance of The Sound of Music at Carnegie Hall (New York City) as Maria. Also featured were Tony Goldwyn as Captain von Trapp, Brooke Shields as Elsa Schraeder and Patrick Page as Max Detweiler.

Osnes starred in the title role of Cinderella on Broadway, which began previews at the Broadway Theatre on January 25 and opened on March 3, 2013. Osnes received positive reviews, won a 2013 Drama Desk award and was nominated for a Tony Award for her performance. She left the production on January 26, 2014, and was replaced by Carly Rae Jepsen.

Osnes starred as Polly Peachum in the Atlantic Theatre Company's Off-Broadway revival of The Threepenny Opera from March to May 2014. For this role, Osnes received her second nomination for the Drama Desk Award for Outstanding Featured Actress in a Musical. Osnes starred as Julie Jordan in the Lyric Opera of Chicago's production of Carousel, alongside Steven Pasquale, in spring 2015. The production closed on May 3, 2015. The production received positive reviews.

She took part in the world premiere of the new original musical, Bandstand, directed and choreographed by Andy Blankenbuehler, which premiered at the Paper Mill Playhouse, New Jersey from October 8 through November 8, 2015. The musical has music by Richard Oberacker and book and lyrics by Robert Taylor and Oberacker. Osnes most recently starred in the musical on Broadway at the Jacobs Theatre, with her co-star Corey Cott. It opened on April 26, 2017, with previews beginning March 31. The production closed on Broadway on September 17, 2017, after 24 previews and 166 regular performances.

Following the closing of Bandstand, Osnes has performed frequently in the Broadway Princess Party show that premiered at Feinstein's/54 Below, which she also hosts and co-developed with music director Benjamin Rauhala. The Princess Party has become a recurring live event at that venue that gathers both popular and up-and-coming stage actresses; at these performances, each actress assumes the identity of a Disney Princess and performs a song from stage or screen in character as that princess, with Osnes typically emceeing and performing as Cinderella. She also performs in this show on the road consistently with fellow Broadway actresses Susan Egan (Beauty and the Beast, Hercules) and Courtney Reed (Aladdin).

In August 2021, Osnes exited a concert production of Crazy For You at the Guild Hall in East Hampton, NY after the producers mandated COVID-19 vaccinations for performers, though she denied the initial reports that said she was fired and said she chose to exit and defended her decision to not get vaccinated.

Television and film
In 2011 Osnes was cast in the pilot for HBO's The Miraculous Year, starring Lee Pace, Susan Sarandon, Patti LuPone, Eddie Redmayne and Norbert Leo Butz; the show was not picked up by the network. In 2013, she voiced a guest spot for the Nickelodeon children's show Team Umizoomi as "Sunny the Sunshine Fairy." In 2013 she appeared in an episode of the CBS television series Elementary.

In 2015, she was the guest artist for the annual Pioneer Day Concert of the Tabernacle Choir at Temple Square, Music for a Summer Evening, broadcast on BYUtv. She also performed with the Tabernacle Choir, the Orchestra at Temple Square, and the Bells on Temple Square for the annual Christmas Concerts of the Tabernacle Choir in December (2015), broadcast on PBS. On July 4, 2017, she performed in PBS’ A Capitol Fourth, which was broadcast live from the West Lawn of the U.S. Capitol.

Osnes starred in the Hallmark Channel film In the Key of Love, starring alongside Scott Michael Foster, as Maggie Case. The movie was released on the network on August 11, 2019. She also starred as Charlotte in Hallmark Movies & Mysteries' A Homecoming for the Holidays and as Anna in Hallmark Channel's One Royal Holiday alongside Aaron Tveit and Victoria Clark.

Filmography

Film

Television

Online videography

Theatre credits

Discography

Awards and nominations

References

External links

 
 
 
 Interview about her role in SOUTH PACIFIC
 NBC profile
 Chanhassen Dinner Theatres
 Mpls.-St. Paul Magazine Article
 
  Laura Osnes: IF I TELL YOU - Songs of Maury Yeston PS Classics
 
 
 

1985 births
Living people
People from Burnsville, Minnesota
People from Eagan, Minnesota
Actresses from Minnesota
American musical theatre actresses
American stage actresses
Participants in American reality television series
Reality casting show winners
University of Wisconsin–Stevens Point alumni
21st-century American actresses
Drama Desk Award winners